Joan Child, AO (3 August 192123 February 2013) was an Australian politician. She was the first woman to be Speaker of the Australian House of Representatives. Up until the election of Anna Burke on 9 October 2012, she was the only female Speaker of the lower house.

Early life
Gloria Joan Liles Olle was born in Yackandandah, Victoria in 1921, daughter of Warren Olle, a postmaster, and his wife Hilda née Seedsman.  She attended Camberwell Girls Grammar School. She married Hal Child, a business manager who was dismissed for stealing while working in Tasmania; but he died suddenly in the mid-1960s, leaving her a widow with five sons (Peter, Andrew, Geoff, Gary and Roger) to raise, the eldest of them 17 years old and the youngest only seven.  To keep the family fed and clothed, she worked in factories, shops, as a cleaner and as a cook. When the youngest boy left school, she joined the entourage of future Deputy Prime Minister Jim Cairns, first as a campaign volunteer and then as a liaison officer.

Career
A member of the Australian Labor Party, Child was elected to the House for the seat of Henty, in the eastern suburbs of Melbourne, in 1974, having narrowly failed to win the seat in 1972. She was the first female Labor member of the House, and only the fourth woman elected to the House in its history. After less than two years, she was defeated in the landslide Liberal victory in 1975. Her attempt to regain the seat in 1977 failed, but she won it back in 1980 and continued to hold it until her retirement in 1990.

During the second term of Labor Prime Minister Bob Hawke, Child became Speaker on 11 February 1986 as the sole nominee of the ALP, and was elected by 78 votes to 64 over her opponent, Allan Rocher. She was re-elected Speaker after the 1987 election, winning against Don Dobie. She was liked and respected by MPs from both sides of the Chamber, but she found the notorious rowdyism of Australian parliamentary conduct difficult to deal with, and her health suffered under the strain. In August 1989 she resigned from the role.

Among the most notable events of her term in office was when the Provisional Parliament House was closed and the new Parliament House was opened in June 1988. Some discussion took place as to whether the old Speaker's Chair, which had been a gift from the Parliament of the United Kingdom, should be installed in the new building; but Child, as Speaker, refused to move the chair. She left the House of Representatives at the 1990 election, when the seat of Henty was abolished.

In the Queen's Birthday Honours of June 1990, Child was appointed an Officer of the Order of Australia. She enjoyed an active retirement, her activities including membership of the Patrons' Council of the Epilepsy Foundation of Victoria. In February 2013, aged 91, she died. A state funeral was held on 5 March.

References

External links

1921 births
2013 deaths
Australian Labor Party members of the Parliament of Australia
Members of the Australian House of Representatives
Members of the Australian House of Representatives for Henty
Officers of the Order of Australia
Speakers of the Australian House of Representatives
Women members of the Australian House of Representatives
20th-century Australian politicians
Women legislative speakers
20th-century Australian women politicians